The 2016 Northern NSW Football season was the third season under the new competition format in northern New South Wales.  The competition consisted of six divisions across the district. As Premiers for the NPL Northern NSW, Edgeworth Eagles qualified for the National Premier Leagues finals series, competing with the other state federation champions in a final knockout tournament to decide the National Premier Leagues Champion for 2016.

League Tables

2016 National Premier League Northern NSW

The 2016 National Premier League Northern NSW season was played over 18 rounds.

Finals

2016 Northern NSW State League Division 1

The 2016 Northern NSW State League Division 1 season is the third season of the new Northern NSW State League Division 1 as the second level domestic association football competition in the district of Northern NSW. 11 teams will compete, all playing each other twice, for a total of 20 rounds. The top team at the end of the year is promoted to the 2017 National Premier Leagues Northern NSW, subject to meeting criteria.

Finals

2016 Zone Premier League

The 2016 Zone Premier League season is the third edition of the Newcastle Zone Premier League as the third level domestic football competition in the district of Northern NSW. 10 teams will compete, all playing each other twice for a total of 18 rounds.

Finals

2016 Zone League 1

The 2016 Zone League 1 season is the third edition of the Zone League 1 as the fourth level domestic football competition in the district of Northern NSW. 10 teams will compete, all playing each other twice for a total of 18 matches.

Finals

2016 Zone League 2

The 2016 Zone League 2 season is the third edition of the Zone League 2 as the fifth level domestic football competition in the district of Northern NSW. 10 teams will compete, all playing each other twice for a total of 18 matches.

Finals

2016 Zone League 3

The 2016 Zone League 3 season is the third edition of the Zone League 3 as the sixth level domestic football competition in the district of Northern NSW. 10 teams will compete, all playing each other twice for a total of 18 matches.

Finals

2016 Women's Premier League

The highest tier domestic football competition in Northern NSW for women is known for sponsorship reasons as the Herald Women's Premier League. The 7 teams played a triple round-robin for a total of 18 games, followed by a finals series.

Cup Competitions

FFA Cup Preliminary rounds

Northern NSW soccer clubs competed in 2016 within the Northern NSW Preliminary rounds for the 2016 FFA Cup. In addition to the A-League club Newcastle Jets, the two Round 7 winners - Lambton Jaffas and Edgeworth FC - qualified for the final rounds of the FFA Cup, entering at the Round of 32. Edgeworth FC made it to the Round of 16, before being eliminated by A-League club Western Sydney Wanderers.

References

2016 in Australian soccer